Upinniemi is a village in the municipality of Kirkkonummi in southern Finland. It is located approximately 12 km south of the municipal centre.

Upinniemi is dominated by the naval base (formerly the Porkkala Naval Base), which is one of the largest military installations in Finland. The headquarters of the Gulf of Finland Naval Command is also located there.

See also 
 Kantvik

References 

Villages in Finland
Finnish Navy
Kirkkonummi